Thoeun Thol (born 9 October 1991) is a Cambodian swimmer. He competed in the men's 50 metre butterfly event at the 2017 World Aquatics Championships.

References

External links
 

1991 births
Living people
Cambodian male butterfly swimmers
Place of birth missing (living people)
Swimmers at the 2018 Asian Games
Asian Games competitors for Cambodia